Glen Richard Moreno (born 24 July 1943) is an American businessman.  Moreno has worked for several large companies in the United States and the United Kingdom, and worked as acting-chairman of UK Financial Investments Limited which manages the British government's bank shareholdings. He has been Chairman of Virgin Money UK since May 2015.

Early life
Glen Moreno was born in California in 1943.  He graduated with a Bachelor of Arts degree from Stanford University in 1965 and was a Rotary Foundation Fellow at the University of Delhi in 1966.  He achieved a Juris Doctor from Harvard Law School in 1969.

Career
Moreno worked for 18 years at Citigroup in Europe and Asia, running the investment banking and trading divisions and becoming a group executive. Moreno is a director of Fidelity International, chairing its audit committee, and was their chief executive from 1987 to 1991.  He is said to be largely responsible for the rapid growth of Fidelity during that period.

In October 2005 Moreno was appointed as Lord Stevenson's replacement as chairman of Pearson PLC, after a 5-month search.  The shortlist included Charles Gibson Smith, the chairman of the London Stock Exchange.  Moreno's appointment came as something of a surprise to the business world as he was not widely known in the United Kingdom and he was described by The Guardian as an "unknown quantity".  His salary at Pearson was £425,000 per year.  Moreno is also a senior independent director of Man Group plc, having been a  non-executive director there since 1994, and persuaded the group to co-sponsor the Man Booker Prize for literature.  He is also a governor of the Ditchley Foundation and a director of the Royal Academy of Dramatic Art.

Moreno was appointed a non-executive director of UK Financial Investments Limited (UKFI), a company established by the British government to manage its shareholding in nationalised (and part-nationalised) banks.  He became the acting chairman of the company when Sir Philip Hampton became chairman of the Royal Bank of Scotland.  During this time Moreno stated that "at no point have I sought the role [of chairman] on a permanent basis".  He quit as acting chairman on 11 February 2009 after HM Treasury said that it would appoint a new permanent chairman.

Moreno's period as chairman of UKFI was controversial because until April 2008 he had been a trustee of the Liechtenstein Global Trust (LGT), a private banking and investment group that has been at the centre of an international investigation into alleged tax evasion.  Moreno had been appointed as a trustee of LGT in 1999, at the same time joining the parent body Prince of Liechtenstein Foundation.  Moreno sat on the LGT's development and compensation committee, which determined executive pay, and advised on investment strategy and policy.  Moreno was renumerated with a salary of Swiss Fr130,000 (£76,000) per year.  He has stated that he had no knowledge of the individual LGT clients.  Moreno's continued employment at the head of UKFI was criticised by the Conservative Party due to his links with LGT.  Further controversy erupted over Fidelity International's donations to the Conservative Party which have amounted to £495,000 since 1994.

He was appointed as senior independent director of Lloyds Banking Group in February 2010, and Deputy Chairman of the Financial Reporting Council in November 2010.

Personal life
Moreno's wife, sister, mother, and niece are all teachers and he splits his time between his London home and a cattle farm in Virginia, United States.

References

1943 births
Living people
Stanford University alumni
Delhi University alumni
Harvard Law School alumni
Businesspeople from California